Arabization or Arabisation in its broadest terms involves the promotion of Arabic language, Arab culture and Arab people. This also refers to the process of growing Arab influence on non-Arab populations, causing a language shift by the latter's gradual adoption of Arabic and incorporation of Arab culture, after the Muslim conquest of the Middle East and North Africa, as well as the Arab nationalist policies of some governments in modern Arab states toward non-Arabic speaking minorities, including Algeria, Iraq, Kuwait, and Sudan.

After the rise of Islam in the Hejaz, Arab culture and language were spread outside the Arabian Peninsula through conquest, trade and intermarriages between members of the non-Arab local population and the peninsular Arabs. Even within the Arabian Peninsula itself, Arabization occurred to non-Arab populations such as the Hutaym in the northwestern Arabia and the Solluba in the Syrian Desert and the region of Mosul. The Arabic language began to serve as a lingua franca in these areas and various dialects were formed. Yemen is traditionally held to be the homeland of the Qahtanite Arabs who, according to Arab tradition, are pure Arabs; however, most of the Yemeni population did not in fact speak Old Arabic prior to the spread of Islam, and spoke the extinct Old South Arabian languages instead.

The influence of Arabic has been profound in many other countries whose cultures have been influenced by Islam. Arabic was a major source of vocabulary for various languages. This process reached its zenith between the 10th and 14th centuries, widely considered to be the high point of Arab culture.

Early Arab expansion in the Near East 

After Alexander the Great, the Nabataean kingdom emerged and ruled a region extending from north of Arabia to the south of Syria. The Nabataeans originated from the Arabian peninsula, who came under the influence of the earlier Aramaic culture, the neighbouring Hebrew culture of the Hasmonean kingdom, as well as the Hellenistic cultures in the region (especially with the Christianization of Nabateans in the 3rd and 4th centuries). The pre-modern Arabic language was created by Nabateans, who developed the Nabataean alphabet which became the basis of modern Arabic script. The Nabataean language, under heavy Arab influence, amalgamated into the Arabic language.

The Arab Ghassanids were the last major non-Islamic Semitic migration northward out of Yemen in late classic era. They were Greek Orthodox Christian, and clients of the Byzantine Empire. They arrived in Byzantine Syria which had a largely Aramean population. They initially settled in the Hauran region, eventually spreading to the entire Levant (modern Lebanon, Israel, Palestine and Jordan), briefly securing governorship of parts of Syria and Transjordan away from the Nabataeans.

The Arab Lakhmid Kingdom was founded by the Lakhum tribe that emigrated from Yemen in the 2nd century and ruled by the Banu Lakhm, hence the name given it. They adopted the religion of the Church of the East, founded in Assyria/Asōristān, opposed to the Ghassanids Greek Orthodox Christianity, and were clients of the Sasanian Empire.

The Byzantines and Sasanians used the Ghassanids and Lakhmids to fight proxy wars in Arabia against each other.

History of Arabization

Arabization during the early Caliphate 

The earliest and most significant instance of "Arabization" was the early Muslim conquests of Muhammad and the subsequent Rashidun and Umayyad Caliphates. They built a Muslim Empire that grew well beyond the Arabian Peninsula, eventually reaching as far as Iberia in the West and Central Asia to the East, covering , making it one of the largest empires in history.

Southern Arabia 

South Arabia is a historical region that consists of the southern region of the Arabian Peninsula, mainly centered in what is now the Republic of Yemen, yet it also included Najran, Jizan, and 'Asir, which are presently in Saudi Arabia, and the Dhofar of present-day Oman.

Old South Arabian was driven to extinction by the Islamic expansion, being replaced by Classical Arabic which is written with the Arabic script. The South Arabian alphabet which was used to write it also fell out of use. A separate branch of South Semitic, the Modern South Arabian languages still survive today as spoken languages in southern of present-day Saudi Arabia, Yemen, and Dhofar in present-day Oman.

Although Yemen is traditionally held to be the homeland of Arabs, most of the sedentary Yemeni population did not speak Arabic (but instead Old South Arabian languages) prior to the spread of Islam.

Eastern Arabia

Before the 7th century CE, the population of Eastern Arabia consisted of Christian Arabs, Zoroastrian Arabs, Jews, and Aramaic-speaking agriculturalists. Some sedentary dialects of Eastern Arabia exhibit Akkadian, Aramaic and Syriac features. The sedentary people of ancient Bahrain were Aramaic speakers and to some degree Persian speakers, while Syriac functioned as a liturgical language.

The Levant

On the eve of the Rashidun Caliphate conquest of the Levant, 634 AD, Syria's population mainly spoke Aramaic; Greek was the official language of administration. Arabization and Islamization of Syria began in the 7th century, and it took several centuries for Islam, the Arab identity, and language to spread; the Arabs of the caliphate did not attempt to spread their language or religion in the early periods of the conquest, and formed an isolated aristocracy. The Arabs of the caliphate accommodated many new tribes in isolated areas to avoid conflict with the locals; caliph Uthman ordered his governor, Muawiyah I, to settle the new tribes away from the original population. Syrians who belonged to Monophysitic denominations welcomed the peninsular Arabs as liberators.

The Abbasids in the eighth and ninth century sought to integrate the peoples under their authority, and the Arabization of the administration was one of the tools. Arabization gained momentum with the increasing numbers of Muslim converts; the ascendancy of Arabic as the formal language of the state prompted the cultural and linguistic assimilation of Syrian converts. Those who remained Christian also became Arabized; it was probably during the Abbasid period in the ninth century that Christians adopted Arabic as their first language; the first translation of the gospels into Arabic took place in this century. Many historians, such as Claude Cahen and Bernard Hamilton, proposed that the Arabization of Christians was completed before the First Crusade. By the thirteenth century, Arabic language achieved dominance in the region and its speakers became Arabs.

Those who were able to avoid losing the Aramaic language are divided between two groups:

The Eastern Aramaic Syriac-speaking group, followers of the West Syriac Rite of the Syriac Orthodox Church and the Syrian Catholic Church; they kept the pre-Islamic Syrian (Syriac) identity throughout the ages, asserting their culture in face of the Arabic language dominance. Linguists, such as Carl Brockelmann and François Lenormant, suggested that the rise of the Garshuni writing (using Syriac alphabet to write Arabic) was an attempt by the Syriac Orthodox to assert their identity. Syriac is still the liturgical language for most of the different Syriac churches in Syria. The Syriac Orthodox Church was known as the Syrian Orthodox Church until 2000, when the holy synod decided to rename it to avoid any nationalistic connotations; the Catholic Church still have "Syrian" in its official name.
The Western Neo-Aramaic-speaking group, that is, the inhabitants of Bakh'a, Jubb'adin and Ma'loula. The residents of Bakh'a and Jubb'adin converted to Islam in the eighteenth century, while in Ma'loula, the majority are Christians, mainly belonging to the Melkite Greek Catholic Church, but also to the Greek Orthodox Church of Antioch, in addition to a Muslim minority, who speaks the same Aramaic dialect of the Christian residents. The people of those villages use Arabic intensively to communicate with each other and the rest of the country; this led to a noticeable Arabic influence on their Aramaic language where around 20% of its vocabulary is of Arabic roots. Bakh'a is steadily losing its dialect; by 1971, people aged younger than 40 could no longer use the Aramaic language properly, although they could understand it. The situation of Bakh'a will eventually lead to the extinction of its Aramaic dialect.

Egypt

Prior to the Islamic conquests, Arabs had been inhabiting the Sinai Peninsula, the Eastern desert and eastern Delta for centuries. These regions of Egypt collectively were known as "Arabia" to the contemporary historians  and writers documenting them. Several pre-Islamic Arab kingdoms, such as the Qedarite Kingdom, extended into these regions. Inscriptions and other archeological remains, such as bowls bearing inscriptions identifying Qedarite kings and Nabatean Arabic inscriptions, affirm the Arab presence in the region.  Egypt was conquered from the Romans by the Rashidun Caliphate in the 7th century CE. The Coptic language, which was written using the Coptic variation of the Greek alphabet, was spoken in most of Egypt prior to the Islamic conquest. Arabic, however, was already being spoken in the eastern fringes of Egypt for centuries prior to the arrival of Islam. By the Mameluke era, the Arabization of the Egyptian populace alongside a shift in the majority religion going from Christianity to Islam, had taken place.

North Africa and Iberia
Neither North Africa nor the Iberian Peninsula were strangers to Semitic culture: the Phoenicians and later the Carthaginians dominated parts of the North African and Iberian shores for more than eight centuries until they were suppressed by the Romans and by the following Vandal and Visigothic invasions, and the Berber incursions. After the Arab invasion of North Africa, The Berber tribes allied themselves with the Umayyad Arab Muslim armies in invading the Iberian Peninsula. Later, in 743 AD, the Berbers defeated the Arab Umayyad armies and expelled them from most of West North Africa (al-Maghreb al-Aqsa) during the Berber Revolt, but not the territory of Ifriqiya which stayed Arab (East Algeria, Tunisia, and West-Libya). Centuries later some migrating Arab tribes settled in some plains while the Berbers remained the dominant group mainly in desert areas including mountains. The Inland North Africa remained exclusively Berber until the 11th century; the Iberian Peninsula, on the other hand, remained Arabized, particularly in the south, until the 16th century.

After finishing the establishment of the Arab city of Al Mahdiya in Tunisia and spreading the Islamic Shiite faith, some of the many Arab Fatimids left Tunisia and parts of eastern Algeria to the local Zirids (972–1148). The invasion of Ifriqiya by the Banu Hilal, a warlike Arab Bedouin tribe encouraged by the Fatimids of Egypt to seize North Africa, sent the region's urban and economic life into further decline. The Arab historian Ibn Khaldun wrote that the lands ravaged by Banu Hilal invaders had become completely arid desert.

After the Umayyad conquest of Hispania, under the Arab Muslim rule Iberia (al-Andalus) incorporated elements of Arabic language and culture. The Mozarabs were Iberian Christians who lived under Arab Islamic rule in Al-Andalus. Their descendants remained unconverted to Islam, but did however adopt elements of Arabic language and culture and dress. They were mostly Roman Catholics of the Visigothic or Mozarabic Rite. Most of the Mozarabs were descendants of Hispano–Gothic Christians and were primarily speakers of the Mozarabic language under Islamic rule. Many were also what the Arabist Mikel de Epalza calls "Neo-Mozarabs", that is Northern Europeans who had come to the Iberian Peninsula and picked up Arabic, thereby entering the Mozarabic community.

Besides Mozarabs, another group of people in Iberia eventually came to surpass the Mozarabs both in terms of population and Arabization. These were the Muladi or Muwalladun, most of whom were descendants of local Hispano-Basques and Visigoths who converted to Islam and adopted Arabic culture, dress, and language. By the 11th century, most of the population of al-Andalus was Muladi, with large minorities of other Muslims, Mozarabs, and Sephardic Jews. It was the Muladi, together with the Berber, Arab, and other (Saqaliba and Zanj) Muslims who became collectively termed in Christian Europe as "Moors".

The Andalusian Arabic language was spoken in Iberia during Islamic rule.

Sicily, Malta, and Crete
A similar process of Arabization and Islamization occurred in the Emirate of Sicily (as-Siqilliyyah), Emirate of Crete (al-Iqritish), and Malta (al-Malta), during this period some segments of the populations of these islands converted to Islam and began to adopt elements of Arabic culture, traditions, and customs. The Arabization process also resulted in the development of the now extinct Siculo-Arabic language, from which the modern Maltese language derives. By contrast, the present-day Sicilian language, which is an Italo-Dalmatian Romance language, retains very little Siculo-Arabic, with its influence being limited to some 300 words.

Sudan
Contacts between Nubians and Arabs long predated the coming of Islam, but the Arabization of the Nile Valley was a gradual process that occurred over a period of nearly one thousand years. Arab nomads continually wandered into the region in search of fresh pasturage, and Arab seafarers and merchants traded at Red Sea ports for spices and slaves. Intermarriage and assimilation also facilitated Arabization. Traditional genealogies trace the ancestry of the Nile valley's area of Sudan mixed population to Arab tribes that migrated into the region during this period. Even many non-Arabic-speaking groups claim descent from Arab forebears. The two most important Arabic-speaking groups to emerge in Nubia were the Ja'alin and the Juhaynah. 
In the 12th century, the Arab Ja'alin tribe migrated into Nubia and Sudan and gradually occupied the regions on both banks of the Nile from Khartoum to Abu Hamad. They trace their lineage to Abbas, uncle of the Islamic prophet Muhammad. They are of Arab origin, but now of mixed blood mostly with Northern Sudanese and Nubians. In the 16th and 17th centuries, new Islamic kingdoms were established – the Funj Sultanate and the Sultanate of Darfur, starting a long period of gradual Islamization and Arabization in Sudan. These sultanates and their societies existed until the Sudan was conquered by the Ottoman Egyptian invasion in 1820, and in the case of Darfur, even until 1916.

In 1846, Arab Rashaida, who speak Hejazi Arabic, migrated from the Hejaz in present-day Saudi Arabia into what is now Eritrea and north-east Sudan, after tribal warfare had broken out in their homeland.  The Rashaida of Sudan live in close proximity with the Beja people, who speak Bedawiye dialects in eastern Sudan.

Sahel

In Medieval times, the Baggara Arabs, a grouping of Arab ethnic groups who speak Shuwa Arabic (which is one of the regional varieties of Arabic in Africa), migrated into Africa, mainly between Lake Chad and southern Kordofan.

Currently, they live in a belt stretching across Sudan, Chad, Niger, Nigeria, Cameroon, Central African Republic and South Sudan and numbering over six million people. Like other Arabic speaking tribes in the Sahara and the Sahel, Baggara tribes have origin ancestry from the Juhaynah Arab tribes who migrated directly from the Arabian peninsula or from other parts of north Africa. 

Arabic is an official language of Chad and Sudan as well as a national language in Niger, Mali, Senegal and South Sudan. In addition, Arabic dialects are spoken of minorities in Nigeria, Cameroon and Central African Republic.

Arabization in modern times

Arabization in Algeria
Arabization is the process of developing and promoting Arabic into a nation's education system, government, and media in order to replace a former language that was enforced into a nation due to colonization. Algeria had been conquered by France and even made to be part of its metropolitan core for 132 years, a significantly longer timespan compared to Morocco and Tunisia, and it was also more influenced by Europe due to the contiguity with French settlers in Algeria: both Algerian and French nationals used to live in the same towns, resulting in the cohabitation of the two populations. Based on these facts, one might be induced to believe that Algeria's Arabization process would have been the hardest to achieve, but on the contrary it was the smoothest in the Maghreb region. While trying to build an independent and unified nation-state after the Evian Accords, the Algerian government under Ahmed Ben Bella's rule began a policy of "Arabization". Indeed, due to the lasting and deep colonization, French was the major administrative and academic language in Algeria, even more so than in neighboring countries. The unification and pursuit of a single Algerian identity was to be found in the Arab language and religion, as stated in the 1963 constitution: La langue arabe est la langue nationale et officielle de l'État ("Arabic is the national and official state language") and  L'islam est la religion de l'État [...] ("Islam is the state religion") and confirmed in 1969, 1976, 1989, 1996 and 2018. According to Abdelhamid Mehri, the decision of Arabic as an official language was the natural choice for Algerians, even though Algeria is a plurilingual nation with a minority, albeit substantial, number of Berbers within the nation, and the local variety of Arabic used in every-day life was distinct from MSA Arabic. However, the process of Arabization was meant not only to promote Islam, but to fix the gap and decrease any conflicts between the different Algerian ethnic groups and promote equality through monolingualism. In 1964 the first practical measure was the Arabization of primary education and the introduction of religious education, the state relying on Egyptian teachers – belonging to the Muslim Brotherhood and therefore particularly religious – due to its lack of literary Arabic-speakers. In 1968, during the Houari Boumediene regime, Arabization was extended, and a law tried to enforce the use of Arabic for civil servants, but again, the major role played by French was only diminished. Many laws followed, trying to ban French, Algerian Arabic and Berber from schools, administrative acts and street signs, but this revived Berber opposition to the state and created a distinction between those educated in Arabic and those in French, the latter still being favored by elites.

The whole policy was ultimately not as effective as anticipated: French has kept its importance and Berber opposition kept growing, contributing to the 1988 October Riots. Some Berber groups, like the Kabyles, felt that their ancestral culture and language were threatened and the Arab identity was given more focus at the expense of their own. After the Algerian Civil War, the government tried to enforce even more the use of Arabic, but the relative effect of this policy after 1998 (the limit fixed for complete Arabization) forced the heads of state to make concessions towards Berber, recognizing it in 2002 as another national language that will be promoted. However, because of literary Arabic's symbolic advantage, as well as being a single language as opposed to the fragmented Berber languages, Arabization is still a goal for the state, for example with laws on civil and administrative procedures.

After the Algerian school system completed its transition to Arabic in 1989, James Coffman made a study of the difference between Arabized and non-Arabized students at  the Université des Sciences et de la Technologie Houari Boumediene (USTHB) and at the University of Algiers. Interviewing students he found Arabized students show decidedly greater support for the Islamist movement and greater mistrust of the West. Arabized students tend to repeat the same ... stories and rumors that abound in the Arabic-language press, particularly Al-Munqidh, the newspaper of the Islamic Salvation Front. They tell about sightings of the word "Allah" written in the afternoon sky, the infiltration into Algeria of Israeli women spies infected with AIDS, the "disproving" of Christianity on a local religious program, and the mass conversion to Islam by millions of Americans. ...  When asked if the new, Arabized students differed from the other students, many students and faculty answered an emphatic yes.

Arabization in Oman
Despite being a nation of the Arabian peninsula, Oman had been home to several native languages other than Arabic, of which Kumzari which is the only native Indo-European language in the Arabian peninsula has been classified as highly endangered by the UNESCO and at risk of dying out in 50 years. Before the takeover of Qaboos as sultan, Arabic was only ever spoken by the inhabitants outside the village of Kumzar, in mosques or with strangers, however since the introduction of Arabic-only schools in 1984, Arabic is hence now spoken at both school and village with it being mandatory in school and as tv and radio are also in Arabic meaning virtually all media the people of Kumzar are exposed to is in Arabic.
 There has also been an internalization of outsiders' negative attitudes toward the Kumzari language to the point where some Kumzari families have begun to speak Arabic to their children at home.

The Modern South Arabian languages have also come under threat in Oman. Hobyot is considered a critically endangered language. The actual number of speakers is unknown, but it is estimated to be only a few hundred. Most of those who maintain the language are elderly, which adds to the likelihood that language extinction is near.

Ethnologue categorizes it as a moribund language (EGIDS 8a). The only fluent speakers that are left are older than the child-bearing age, which ultimately makes integration of the language into subsequent generations highly improbable. Mechanisms of transmission would have to be created from outside the community in order to preserve it.

The Harsusi language is also critically endangered, as most Harsusi children now attend Arabic-language schools and are literate in Arabic, Harsusi is spoken less in the home, meaning that it is not being passed down to future generations. With the discovery of oil in the area and the reintroduction of the Arabian Oryx in the area which has provided job opportunities for Harsusi men, this has led to them using primarily Arabic or Mehri when communicating with their co-workers. These factors have also caused many Harasis to speak Arabic and Mehri in addition to or in place of Harsusi. These pressures led one researcher to conclude in 1981 that "within a few generations Harsusi will be replaced by Arabic, more specifically by the Omani Arabic standard dialect" though this has not yet materialized. UNESCO has categorised Harsusi as a language that is "definitely endangered".

The Shehri language has also come under threat in recent years, prior to the Arabization of Oman, Shehri was once spoken from Yemen's Hadhramaut region to Ras Al Hadd in Eastern Oman. Until around as little as forty years ago, Shehri was spoken by all of the inhabitants of Dhofar as the common language, including by the native Arabic speakers in Salalah who spoke it fluently. The remainder of Dhofar's inhabitants all spoke Shehri as their mother tongue. Today however Arabic has taken over as the form of mutual communication in Dhofar and is now exclusively spoken by those to whom it is their native tongue. A number of the older generation of Shehri language speakers, particularly those who live in the mountains, don't even speak Arabic and it was only around fifty years ago that most of Dhofar's Shehri speaking population began to learn it. The fact that Arabic has a written form unlike Shehri has also greatly contributed to its decline.

Another language, Bathari is the most at risk of dying out with its numbers (as of 2019) at currently anywhere from 12 to 17 fluent elderly speakers whereas there are some middle aged speakers but they mix their ancestral tongue with Arabic instead. The tribe seems to be dying out with the language also under threat from modern education solely in Arabic. The Bathari language is nearly extinct. Estimates are that the number of remaining speakers are under 100.

Arabization in Morocco 
Following 44 years of colonization by France, Morocco began promoting the use of Arabic (MSA Arabic) to create a united Moroccan national identity, and increase literacy throughout the nation away from any predominant language within the administration and educational system. Unlike Algeria, Morocco did not encounter with the French as strongly due to the fact that the Moroccan population was scattered throughout the nation and major cities, which resulted in a decrease of French influence compared to the neighboring nations. According to these facts, one could consider that Morocco would lay an easier path to Arabization and attain it at a faster rate than its neighboring country Algeria, although the results were on the contrary. First and foremost, educational policy was the main focus within the process, debates surfaced between officials who preferred a "modern and westernized" education with enforcement of bilingualism while others fought for a traditional route with a focus of "Arabo-Islamic culture". Once the Istiqal Party took power, the party focused on placing a language policy siding with the traditional ideas of supporting and focusing on Arabic and Islam. The Istiqal Party implemented the policy rapidly and by the second year after gaining independence, the first year of primary education was completely Arabized, and a bilingual policy was placed for the remaining primary education decreasing the hours of French being taught in a staggered manner. Arabization in schools had been more time-consuming and difficult than expected due to the fact that the first 20 years following independence, politicians (most of which were educated in France or French private school in Morocco) were indecisive as to if Arabization was best for the country and its political and economic ties with European nations. Regardless, complete Arabization can only be achieved if Morocco becomes completely independent from France in all aspects; politically, economically, and socially. Around 1960, Hajj Omar Abdeljalil the education minister at the time reversed all the effort made to Arabize the public school and reverted to pre-independent policies, favoring French and westernized learning. Another factor that reflected the support of reversing the Arabization process in Morocco, was the effort made by King Hassan II, who supported the Arabization process but on the contrary increased political and economic dependence on France. Due to the fact that Morocco remained dependent on France and wanted to keep strong ties with the Western world, French was supported by the elites more than Arabic for the development of Morocco.

Arabization in Tunisia 
The Arabization process in Tunisia theoretically should have been the easiest within the North African region because it has less than 1% of Berber speaking population, and practically 100% of the nation is a native Tunisian Darija speaker. However, it was the least successful due to its dependence on European nations and belief in Westernizing the nation for the future development of the people and the country. Much like Morocco, Tunisian leaders' debate consisted of traditionalists and modernists, traditionalists claiming that Arabic (specifically Classical Arabic) and Islam are the core of Tunisia and its national identity, while modernists believed that Westernized development distant from "Pan-Arabist ideas" are crucial for Tunisia's progress. Modernists had the upper hand, considering elites supported their ideals, and after the first wave of graduates that had passed their high school examinations in Arabic  were not able to find jobs nor attend a university because they did not qualify due to French preference in any upper-level university or career other than Arabic and Religious Studies Department. There were legitimate efforts made to Arabize the nation from the 1970s up until 1982, though the efforts came to an end and the process of reversing all the progress of Arabization began and French implementation in schooling took effect. The Arabization process was criticized and linked with Islamic extremists, resulting in the process of "Francophonie" or promoting French ideals, values, and language throughout the nation and placing its importance above Arabic. Although Tunisia gained its independence, nevertheless the elites supported French values above Arabic, the answer to developing an educated and modern nation, all came from Westernization. The constitution stated that Arabic was the official language of Tunisia but nowhere did it claim that Arabic must be utilized within the administrations or every-day life, which resulted in an increase of French usage not only in science and technology courses. Further, major media channels were in French, and government administrations were divided—some were in Arabic while others were in French.

Arabization in Sudan

Sudan is an ethnically mixed country that is economically and politically dominated by the society of central northern Sudan, where many strongly identify as Arabs and Muslims. The population in South Sudan consists mostly of Christian and Animist Nilotic people, who have been regarded for centuries as non-Arab, African people. Apart from Modern Standard Arabic, taught in schools and higher education, and the spoken forms of Sudanese Arabic colloquial, several other languages are spoken by diverse ethnic groups.

Since independence in 1956, Sudan has been a multilingual country, with Sudanese Arabic as the major first or second language. In the 2005 constitution of the Republic of Sudan and following the Comprehensive Peace Agreement, the official languages of Sudan were declared Modern Standard Arabic (MSA) and English. Before the independence of South Sudan in 2011, people in the southern parts of the country, who mainly speak Nilo-Saharan languages or Juba Arabic, were subjected to the official policy of Arabization by the central government. The constitution declared, however, that "all indigenous languages of the Sudan are national languages and shall be respected, developed, and promoted," and it allowed any legislative body below the national level to adopt any other national language(s) as additional official working language(s) within that body's jurisdiction.

MSA is also the language used in Sudan's central government, the press, as well as in official programmes of Sudan television and Radio Omdurman. Several lingua francas have emerged, and many people have become genuinely multilingual, fluent in a native language spoken at home, a lingua franca, and perhaps other languages.

Arabization in Mauritania
Mauritania is an ethnically-mixed country that is economically and politically dominated by those who identify as Arabs and/or Arabic-speaking Berbers. About 30% of the population is considered "Black African", and the other 40%  are Arabized Blacks, both groups suffering high levels of discrimination. Recent Black Mauritanian protesters have complained of "comprehensive Arabization" of the country.

Arabization in Iraq

Saddam Hussein's Ba'ath Party had aggressive Arabization policies involving driving out many pre-Arab and non-Arab races – mainly Kurds, Assyrians, Yezidis, Shabaks, Armenians, Turcomans, Kawliya, Circassians and Mandeans – replacing them with Arab families.

In the 1970s, Saddam Hussein exiled between 350,000 to 650,000 Shia Iraqis of Iranian ancestry (Ajam). Most of them went to Iran. Those who could prove an Iranian/Persian ancestry in Iran's court received Iranian citizenship (400,000) and some of them returned to Iraq after Saddam.

During the Iran-Iraq War, the Anfal campaign destroyed many Kurdish, Assyrian and other ethnic minority villages and enclaves in North Iraq, and their inhabitants were often forcibly relocated to large cities in the hope that they would be Arabized.

This policy drove out 500,000 people in the years 1991–2003. The Baathists also pressured many of these ethnic groups to identify as Arabs, and restrictions were imposed upon their languages, cultural expression and right to self-identification.

Arabization in Syria

Since the independence of Syria in 1946, the ethnically diverse Rojava region in northern Syria suffered grave human rights violations, because all governments pursued a most brutal policy of Arabization. While all non-Arab ethnic groups within Syria, such as Assyrians, Armenians, Turcomans and Mhallami have faced pressure from Arab Nationalist policies to identify as Arabs, the most archaic of it was directed against the Kurds. In his report for the 12th session of the UN Human Rights Council titled Persecution and Discrimination against Kurdish Citizens in Syria, the United Nations High Commissioner for Human Rights held: "Successive Syrian governments continued to adopt a policy of ethnic discrimination and national persecution against Kurds, completely depriving them of their national, democratic and human rights — an integral part of human existence. The government imposed ethnically-based programs, regulations and exclusionary measures on various aspects of Kurds' lives — political, economic, social and cultural."

The Kurdish language was not officially recognized, it had no place in public schools. A decree from 1989 prohibited the use of Kurdish at the workplace as well as in marriages and other celebrations. In September 1992 came another government decree that children not be registered with Kurdish names. Also businesses could not be given Kurdish names. Books, music, videos and other material could not be published in Kurdish language. Expressions of Kurdish identity like songs and folk dances were outlawed and frequently prosecuted under a purpose-built criminal law against "weakening national sentiment". Celebrating the Nowruz holiday was often constrained.

In 1973 the Syrian authorities confiscated 750 square kilometers of fertile agricultural land in Al-Hasakah Governorate, which were owned and cultivated by tens of thousands of Kurdish citizens, and gave it to Arab families brought in from other provinces. In 2007 in another such scheme in Al-Hasakah governate, 6,000 square kilometers around Al-Malikiyah were granted to Arab families, while tens of thousands of Kurdish inhabitants of the villages concerned were evicted. These and other expropriations of ethnic Kurdish citizens followed a deliberate masterplan, called "Arab Belt initiative", attempting to depopulate the resource-rich Jazeera of its ethnic Kurdish inhabitants and settle ethnic Arabs there.

After the Turkish-led forces had captured Afrin District in early 2018, they began to implement a resettlement policy by moving Turkish-backed Free Syrian Army fighters and Sunni Arab refugees from southern Syria into the empty homes that belonged to displaced locals. The previous owners, most of them Kurds or Yazidis, were often prevented from returning to Afrin. Refugees from Eastern Ghouta, Damascus, said that they were part of "an organised demographic change" which was supposed to replace the Kurdish population of Afrin with an Arab majority.

Arabization in Islamic State of Iraq and Levant campaign

While formally committed to Islamism and polyethnicity, the Islamic State of Iraq and Levant (ISIL) has frequently targeted non-Arab groups such as Kurds, Assyrians, Armenians, Turcomans, Shabaks and Yezidis. It has often been claimed that these (ISIL) campaigns were a part of an organized Arabization plan. A Kurdish official in Iraqi Kurdistan claimed that in particular the ISIL campaign in Sinjar was a textbook case of Arabization.

It has been suggested in academia that modern Islamism in general and the Islamic State of Iraq and Levant (ISIL) in particular would be motivated and driven by a desire to reinforce Arab cultural dominion over the religion of Islam.

Reverse Arabization

Historic reversions

Invasion of Malta (1091)

The invaders besieged Medina (modern Mdina), the main settlement on the island, but the inhabitants managed to negotiate peace terms. The Muslims freed Christian captives, swore an oath of loyalty to Roger and paid him an annual tribute. Roger's army then sacked Gozo and returned to Sicily with the freed captives.

The attack did not bring about any major political change, but it paved the way for the re-Christianization of Malta, which began in 1127. Over the centuries, the invasion of 1091 was romanticized as the liberation of Christian Malta from oppressive Muslim rule, and a number of traditions and legends arose from it, such as the unlikely claim that Count Roger gave his colours red and white to the Maltese as their national colours.

Reconquista (1212-1492)
The Reconquista in the Iberian Peninsula is the most notable example of a historic reversion of Arabization. The process of Arabization and Islamization was reversed as the mostly Christian kingdoms in the north of the peninsula conquered Toledo in 1212 and Cordoba in 1236. As Granada was conquered in January 1492 also the last remaining Emirate on the Peninsula was conquered. The re-conquered territories later were Romanized and Christianized, although the culture, languages and religious traditions imposed differed from those of the previous Visigothic kingdom.

Reversions in modern times
In modern times, there have been various political developments to reverse the process of Arabization. Notable among these are:

 The 1929 introduction of the Latin Alphabet instead of the Arabic Abjad in Turkey as part of the Kemalist reforms.
 The 1948 establishment of the State of Israel as a Jewish polity, Hebraization of Palestinian place names, use of Hebrew as an official language (with Arabic remaining co-official) and the de-Arabization of the Sephardim who arrived in Israel from the Arab world.
 The 1992 establishment of a Kurdish-dominated polity in the Mesopotamia as Iraqi Kurdistan.
 The 2012 establishment of a multi-ethnic Democratic Federation of Northern Syria.
 Berberism, a Berber political-cultural movement of ethnic, geographic, or cultural nationalism present in Algeria, Morocco and broader North Africa including Mali. The Berberist movement is in opposition to Islamist-driven cultural Arabization and the pan-Arabist political ideology, and is also associated with secularism.
Arabization of Malays was criticized by Sultan Ibrahim Ismail of Johor. He urged the retention of Malay culture instead of introducing Arab culture. He called on people to not mind unveiled women or mixed sex handshaking, and urged against using Arabic words in place of Malay words. He suggested Saudi Arabia as a destination for those who wanted Arab culture. He said that he was going to adhere to Malay culture himself. Abdul Aziz Bari said that Islam and Arab culture are intertwined and criticized the Johor Sultan for what he said. Datuk Haris Kasim, who leads the Selangor Islamic Religious Department, also criticized the Sultan for his remarks.

See also 

 Cultural appropriation
 Settler colonialism
 Arab language
 Arabic script
 Arab nationalism
 Pan-Arabism
 Islamization
 Cultural assimilation
 Human rights in Rojava
 Arabization and Islamicization in post-conquest Iran
 Arabization of the Jordanian Army command
 Arab Orthodox Movement
 Genetic studies on Arabs
 Sara al-Qutiyya

Notes

References

External links
 Genetic Evidence for the Expansion of Arabian Tribes into the Southern Levant and North Africa
 Bossut, Camille Alexandra. Arabization in Algeria : language ideology in elite discourse, 1962-1991 (Abstract) - PhD thesis, University of Texas at Austin, May 2016.

 
Arab
Arab history
Arab culture
Arabic languages